The 1952 United States Senate election in Vermont took place on November 4, 1952. Incumbent Republican Ralph Flanders successfully ran for re-election to another term in the United States Senate, defeating Democratic candidate Allan R. Johnston.

Republican primary

Results

Democratic primary

Results

General election

Results

References

Vermont
1952
1952 Vermont elections